Under the Mountain is an eight-part television series based on the 1979 novel of the same name written by Maurice Gee, first transmitted in 1981 and produced by Television New Zealand. Many of the minor roles in this series were played by people who were at the time well known performers in New Zealand.

Series overview

Plot
The show focuses on twins Rachel and Theo Matheson. While on school summer holidays in Auckland, they are contacted by a man named Mr. Jones, who had met them briefly eight years earlier. This time, Mr. Jones reveals his true identity and mission. He is an alien—a member of the mysterious race called The People Who Understand and was sent from another world in a battle against another race of aliens. These latter creatures were a family of slimy, slug-like beasts who could take on human form. Led by the evil Mr. Wilberforce, the slug monsters were now bent on destroying Earth and only the twins' emerging psychic abilities could turn them back. The other major conflict presented by the series is that of Rachel and Theo's emerging abilities. Rachel accepted the truth of their abilities, while Theo was more of a cynic and often challenged Mr. Jones. The psychic abilities in the series increase in effectiveness as the individual grows in trust and acceptance of his or her abilities. In the final episode of the series, the twins are each required to throw a stone and focus their psychic energy into the stone to create a red and blue bridge-like construct that will defeat the Wilberforces. Because Theo's faith in his abilities and his belief in supernatural phenomena in general is lacking, his half of the bridge is insufficient to complete the construct. Mr. Jones uses the last of his life energy to complete the construct and defeat the Wilberforces, and can no longer be with Rachel and Theo as a result.

Episode guide

Location
Filming for the farm & bush scenes in the first episode took place near Silverdale, North of Auckland, at Mt. Pleasant, an historic dairy farm & homestead in Pine Valley Road.

Cast and crew
 Kirsty Wilkinson as Rachel Matheson
 Lance Warren as Theo Matheson
 Roy Leywood as Mr. Jones
 Bill Johnson as Mr. Wilberforce
 Bill Ewens as Ricky

 Directed by: Chris Bailey
 Produced by: Tom Finlayson
 Written by: Maurice Gee
 Screenplay by: Ken Catran
 Music by: Bernie Allen

Broadcast and release

International distribution
 In the Netherlands, the title is Moddermonsters (Mud Monsters) but also known as De Monsterplaneet (The Monster Planet).

 In the United States, it was shown on The Third Eye on Nickelodeon from the early 1980s.

Home video release
All eight episodes have been released on one dual-layer region-free (region 0) DVD in New Zealand.

For some reason the video format chosen for the DVD was NTSC, while the original production material would have been produced for PAL transmission as that is the standard in use throughout New Zealand and Australia. This makes the DVD unplayable for people with certain older TV sets unable to display NTSC.

Picture quality is described on the DVD cover as "subject to quality of dated production source." Audio is mono, but is of an acceptable quality.

Remake

In 2009 Under the Mountain was adapted into a New Zealand feature film with cameos by Kirsty Wilkinson and Bill Johnson, directed by Jonathan King.

References

External links
 
 Information about the series

1980s New Zealand television series
1980s television miniseries
1981 New Zealand television series debuts
1981 New Zealand television series endings
English-language television shows
New Zealand children's television series
New Zealand science fiction television series
New Zealand television miniseries
Television shows based on New Zealand novels
Television shows filmed in New Zealand
Television shows set in Auckland
TVNZ original programming
Television series about siblings 

pl:Tajemnica wygasłych wulkanów